Goldsmith Collins (16 September 1901 – 27 April 1982) was an Australian rules footballer who played with Fitzroy in the VFL. 

He made his debut with Fitzroy in 1922 and the following season was the club's best and fairest. His brothers, Harry and Norm both played for Fitzroy.

Clashes with the law

Vexatious litigant
On 27 March 1953, on the basis of his having "instituted 40 litigations in the last five years", Collins was declared a vexatious litigant.

Contempt of court
Later that year, was jailed for four months, by the Supreme Court, for contempt of court, when he assaulted a detective who was attempting "to take him into custody to serve a term of one month imposed for an earlier contempt in writing insulting letters to judges of the court".

Violent behaviour
In April 1954, already in Pentridge Gaol, serving the earlier sentence, and, once again, charged with contempt of court, he put on such an extraordinary display (shouting insults at the judge, etc.) that the judge collapsed. Once the judge had recovered enough to be removed from the court, the Chief Justice, Sir Edmund Herring, was called to the court. Herring adjourned the hearing indefinitely and ordered that Collins be returned to Pentridge. Collins, then, "fought violently with two warders and a court policeman and was hand cuffed by Detective-Sergeant W. W. Mooney, who had joined in to help them".

References

External links

 Boyles Football Photos: Goldie Collins.
 Holmesby, Russell and Main, Jim (2007). The Encyclopedia of AFL Footballers. 7th ed. Melbourne: Bas Publishing.

1901 births
Fitzroy Football Club players
Fitzroy Football Club Premiership players
Mitchell Medal winners
1982 deaths
Australian rules footballers from Melbourne
Vexatious litigants
One-time VFL/AFL Premiership players
People from Malvern, Victoria
Criminals from Melbourne